A referendum on the initiatives of King Norodom Sihanouk at the Geneva Conference was held in Cambodia on 7 February 1955. It was approved by 99.8% of voters.

Results

References

Referendums in Cambodia
Geneva Conference referendum
Cambodia